Emamzadeh Ali (also Romanized as Emāmzādeh ‘Alī; also known as Imamzādeh) is a village in Khesht Rural District, Khesht District, Kazerun County, Fars Province, Iran. At the 2006 census, its population was 264, in 51 families.

References 

Populated places in Kazerun County